Lyonetia clerkella, the apple leaf miner, is a moth in the family Lyonetiidae. It is found all over Europe, north-western Siberia, the Far East, northern Africa, the Middle East, Turkey, India and Japan.

The wingspan is 7–9 mm. The forewings are shining white, sometimes partly or wholly suffused with fuscous ; a brown or darker fuscous blotch in disc posteriorly ; a bent transverse line beyond this, and three costal streaks connected with an apical spot brown or darker fuscous ; a round black apical dot ; a projecting blackish hook in apical cilia. Hindwings are dark grey. The larva is pale green.

Adults are on wing in June, August and from October to April in the Benelux. There are two or more generations per year.

The larvae feed on various fruit trees, including Betulaceae and Rosaceae species.

References

External links
 
 Plant Parasites of Europe
 UKmoths
 Lepidoptera of Belgium

Lyonetiidae
Leaf miners
Moths described in 1758
Moths of Africa
Moths of Asia
Moths of Europe
Moths of Japan
Taxa named by Carl Linnaeus